The Estación Polar Científica Conjunta Glaciar Unión (or Union Glacier Joint Scientific Polar Station) or Union Glacier Station is a summer Antarctic base of Chile, situated on Union Glacier in the Ellsworth Mountains. It is jointly operated from November to January by the Chilean Antarctic Institute and the three armed forces of Chile. It was inaugurated on 4 January 2014 by Chilean President Sebastián Piñera Echeñique.

In 2013, the Antarctic stations Teniente Arturo Parodi Alister and Antonio Huneeus were dismantled and their equipment was transferred to Union Glacier Station. This followed the relocation in November 2010 of the operations of the private American company Antarctic Logistics & Expeditions LLC, which has operated the landing strip on Union Glacier since December 2008 and also runs Union Glacier Camp.

After the American base Amundsen-Scott and the Chinese base Kunlun, Union Glacier Station is the nearest active base to the South Pole, located 1080 km away.

See also
 List of Antarctic research stations
 List of Antarctic field camps
 Crime in Antarctica

References

External links 
 Article of the Inauguration of the Union Glacier Station in the Ministry of External Relations of Chile
 Chile makes the greater scientific expedition in the Union Glacier

Chilean Antarctic Territory
2014 in Chile
Military of Chile
Ellsworth Land
Outposts of Antarctica
2014 establishments in Antarctica